Ysgol Glan Clwyd (or Ysgol Uwchradd Glan Clwyd) is a Welsh medium secondary school, and was the first of its kind. It opened in 1956, initially at Rhyl on the coast before moving inland to St Asaph in 1969. It is overseen by the Denbighshire Local Education Authority.

Present 
In 2022 it had 1034 students, of whom 108 were in the sixth form. A government inspection reported that although 70% students are from homes where English is the main or only language spoken, 95% of the students spoke Welsh as well as a native speaker. All subjects are taught in Welsh apart from English and a few in the sixth form.

There is a class for non-Welsh speakers to learn Welsh. Later in school, these pupils join mainstream classes.

The school has been reconstructed and refurbished in regards to Denbighshire County Council's twenty-first century school modernisation plan. The new building and refurbishment officially opened in September 2017, but pupils were moved into the building when the school opened in January 2017.

Musical theatre
Musical theatre is important in Ysgol Glan Clwyd. The school has recently put on a musical under the name of Sioe Y Sioeau, which included songs from The Lion King and Hairspray. It also included the play Blood Brothers.

Notable former pupils

 Becky Brewerton, professional golfer
 Caryl Parry Jones, radio presenter, actress and singer
 Gareth Jones, television presenter

References

External links
  2006 inspection report
 Education in Welsh: A short history on bbc.co.uk, accessed July 5, 2007
 Official Website

1956 establishments in Wales
Educational institutions established in 1956
Secondary schools in Denbighshire
St Asaph
Welsh-language schools